The Gadget Shop (stylised gadgetshop) was a national British high-street chain of stores, predominantly selling gadgets, toys and lighting products, founded by Jonathan Elvidge in 1991. At its height, it was one of the leading UK novelty gadget retailers. The chain went into administration in 2005, and subsequently closed. Its assets have previously been owned by The Entertainer, and are currently owned by WHSmith.

History 
Jonathan Elvidge founded the chain in 1991. The ideology behind the chain was that its target market would be a retail experience for teenagers and young adults, offering the sale of DVD players, audio and computer equipment, alongside novelty toys.

At its height, it had 45 branches across the UK, and employed around 700 people.

The chain collapsed into administration in April 2005, and closed. The closure came a month after rival gadget retailer, Must Have It (formerly The Discovery Store), collapsed following difficult Christmas trading, mainly due to various department and toy stores entering the gadget market. Its closure was due to a lack of agreement among owners.

Legacy 
Since 2010, its current owner, retailer WHSmith, have used 'The Gadget Shop' branding on some of its products.

See also 
 The Discovery Store

References 

Consumer electronics retailers of the United Kingdom
Online retailers of the United Kingdom
Companies that have entered administration in the United Kingdom
Defunct retail companies of the United Kingdom
Toy retailers of the United Kingdom